Gastón Adrián Lezcano (born November 21, 1986 in San Nicolás de los Arroyos, Argentina) is an Argentine footballer currently playing for Chilean club Cobresal, as a left or right winger.

Career

O'Higgins

On 31 December 2013, he is signed by the O'Higgins for the 2013–14 Chilean Primera División season.

In 2014, he won the Supercopa de Chile against Deportes Iquique, replacing at the 59' to Gonzalo Barriga.

Honours

Club
General Lamadrid
Primera C: 2010-11

O'Higgins
Supercopa de Chile: 2014

Universidad Católica
Primera División de Chile (2): 2020, 2021
 Supercopa de Chile (2): 2020, 2021

References

External links
 
 

1986 births
Living people
Argentine footballers
Argentine expatriate footballers
General Lamadrid footballers
Cañuelas footballers
Cobreloa footballers
O'Higgins F.C. footballers
Santiago Morning footballers
Club Atlético 3 de Febrero players
Atlético Morelia players
Chilean Primera División players
Liga MX players
Primera Nacional players
Expatriate footballers in Chile
Expatriate footballers in Paraguay
Expatriate footballers in Mexico
Association football midfielders
People from San Nicolás de los Arroyos
Sportspeople from Buenos Aires Province